Robert Bourne (born 10 September 1998) is an English footballer who plays as a midfielder for Newton-le-Willows.

Career
Bourne began his career with EFL League One side Bury, after coming through the club's academy he made his debut for the first-team on 8 May 2016 in a league match against Southend United. In the succeeding September, Bourne was loaned to Mossley; appearing nine times. On 6 January 2017, Bury announced that Bourne had been released. He subsequently joined Northern Premier League Division One North club Trafford. His bow came on 14 January against Droylsden. After a month and one appearance, Bourne departed on 14 February to National League North's Stalybridge Celtic. He left on 5 May.

He went on trial with FC United of Manchester in July, featuring in games against AVRO FC and Abbey Hey. On 8 October, Bourne joined Skelmersdale United. His first appearance for the club came on 14 October versus Ramsbottom United. Seven more matches were played for Skelmersdale United. On 1 January 2018, Bourne left English football to join Division 2 Norrland side Ytterhogdals IK in Sweden. He scored his first senior goal in his twelfth appearance, during an away win versus Gällivare Malmbergets on 8 July. He parted company in September, prior to signing for Widnes in October.

In February 2019, Bourne completed a move to West Didsbury & Chorlton. His debut arrived in a fixture with Winsford United on 23 February, as the aforementioned team won 3–2. In the succeeding August, Bourne started playing for Newton-le-Willows in the Warrington & District Football League. He netted on debut against Eagle JFC on 31 August. Bourne scored a hat-trick over Blackbrook in the Guardian Cup on 30 November.

Career statistics
.

References

External links
 

1998 births
Living people
Footballers from Warrington
English footballers
Association football midfielders
English expatriate footballers
Expatriate footballers in Sweden
English expatriate sportspeople in Sweden
English Football League players
Northern Premier League players
National League (English football) players
Division 2 (Swedish football) players
North West Counties Football League players
Warrington & District Football League players
Bury F.C. players
Mossley A.F.C. players
Trafford F.C. players
Stalybridge Celtic F.C. players
Skelmersdale United F.C. players
Ytterhogdals IK players
Widnes F.C. players
West Didsbury & Chorlton A.F.C. players